Roland Gerber (born May 21, 1984) is a Swiss professional ice hockey player. Gerber is currently an unrestricted free agent who most recently played with SCL Tigers of the Swiss National League (NL).

Gerber made his National League A debut playing with SC Langnau during the 2001–02 NLA season.

References

External links

1984 births
Living people
EHC Biel players
EHC Olten players
SC Bern players
GCK Lions players
Genève-Servette HC players
HC Red Ice players
SC Langenthal players
SCL Tigers players
Swiss ice hockey forwards
EHC Visp players
ZSC Lions players